Ashville Football Club is a football club based in Wallasey, England. They are currently members of the North West Counties League Division One South and play at Villa Park, Wallasey.

History
Founded in 1949 by D-Day veteran John Dennett, Ashville initially entered the Wallasey Youth League, joining the Bebington League in 1951. After winning the Bebington League, Ashville joined the Wirral Combination, winning the league all three seasons they competed in it. In 1955, Ashville entered the West Cheshire League, winning Division Two at the first attempt. In the 1990–91 season, Ashville entered the FA Vase for the first time. In 2005–06, Ashville reached the fourth round of the competition, before losing 1–0 away at Buxton. In 2022, the club was admitted into the North West Counties League Division One South.

Ground
In 1962, Ashville moved into their current ground at Villa Park, Wallasey.

Records
Best FA Vase performance: Fourth round, 2005–06

References

Wallasey
Association football clubs established in 1949
1949 establishments in England
Football clubs in England
Football clubs in Merseyside
West Cheshire Association Football League clubs
North West Counties Football League clubs